The discography of Japanese actress and singer-songwriter Takako Matsu includes ten studio, three compilation, two live, seven video albums, twenty-one singles, and twenty music videos. Born into a family of actors, Matsu made her debut as a stage performer before her roles in TV dramas (beginning with the 1994 NHK taiga drama series Hana no Ran) and films (beginning with 1997's Tokyo Biyori). That year she released her first single, "Ashita, Haru ga Kitara", which peaked at number 8 on the Oricon Singles Chart and was certified platinum by the Recording Industry Association of Japan (RIAJ) for shipments of 400,000 copies. Matsu's debut album, Sora no Kagami (also released that year), peaked at number 4 on the Oricon Albums Chart. Selling over 300,000 copies, it earned a platinum certification from the RIAJ and Matsu was named Best New Artist of the Year at the 12th Japan Gold Disc Awards.

In 1998 she starred in the Shunji Iwai short film April Story as Uzuki Nireno, a shy girl who leaves home to attend the University of Tokyo. For the film's soundtrack, Matsu performed five piano songs. Her second studio album, Ai no Tobira, was released on Arista Japan the same year; it peaked at number 3 on the Oricon chart, and was certified gold by the RIAJ. Moving to Universal Japan in 1999, Matsu released "Yume no Shizuku"; it peaked at number 8 on the Oricon chart, her fourth top-ten hit on the Oricon Singles Chart. Her album Itsuka, Sakura no Ame ni... was also certified gold. About a year later, Matsu's fourth studio album (A Piece of Life) and first compilation album (Five Years: Singles) were released. Both peaked in the top five on the Oricon Albums Chart, and the latter was certified gold. A live album of her A Piece of Life concert tour, released in 2002, peaked at number 32 on the Oricon Albums Chart; the tour DVD reached number 8 on the Oricon DVD chart. Matsu's next two studio albums peaked at number 12 on the Oricon chart.

In 2004 "Toki no Fune", co-written by Matsu and Akeboshi and produced by the latter, was released as the first single from her seventh studio album (Bokura ga Ita). The song, the theme for the TBS drama series Tōbōsha Runaway, peaked at number 5 on the Oricon singles chart and the album peaked at number 14 on the albums chart. In 2006 Matsu released "Minna Hitori", another top-10 hit. Her parent studio album, Cherish You, peaked at the same position on the Oricon Albums Chart. After the disappointing performance of her ninth studio album (Time for Music) and its accompanying singles, Matsu's musical career saw a resurgence with "Let It Go" (which she performed for the Japanese version of the Disney animated film, Frozen); the song peaked at number 2 on the Billboard Japan Hot 100, and was certified million by the RIAJ.

Studio albums

Compilation albums

Live albums

LP records

Singles

As lead artist

Collaborations and promotional singles

Other album appearances

Videography

Video releases

Music videos

References
Notes
A  Charted in 2012.
B  The track was released digitally only.

Specific references

Discographies of Japanese artists
Pop music discographies